Kelsick is a hamlet in the civil parish of Dundraw in Cumbria, United Kingdom. Kelsick is accessed by two side-roads off the B5302 road, which runs between Silloth and Wigton.

Etymology
The name Kelsick is believed to be derived from an Anglo-Saxon word meaning "a spring" or "a well".

History
On 7 July 1942, a Miles Master aircraft from RAF Annan crashed near Kelsick, with the loss of one life. A second occupant of the aircraft was able to successfully bail out before the crash. A rescue party from nearby RAF Kirkbride was assembled, but boggy ground, excess water, and fading light led to the attempt being called off. An engine from the aircraft was recovered in 1976.

In 1990, a pond at Kelsick was restored by local conservationists.

Amenities
Allerdale Borough Council provides refuse collection, street lighting, and other services to residents of Kelsick. Stagecoach Cumbria & North Lancashire provides a bus service, the number 400, which runs near to Kelsick along the B5302 road. The bus runs approximately every two hours from Monday to Saturday between Silloth and Carlisle. The nearest primary school, Holme Cultram Abbey school, is located in Abbeytown, and the nearest secondary school, The Nelson Thomlinson School, is in Wigton.

Climate
Kelsick, like the rest of the Solway Plain, has an oceanic climate (Köppen climate classification Cfb), with mild summers and winters which generally avoid extremes of temperature. Rainfall is fairly consistent throughout the year, with approximately 15 days a month where measurable rainfall occurs.

References

Hamlets in Cumbria
Allerdale